The Bulgarian Academy of Sciences (abbreviated BAS; , Balgarska akademiya na naukite, abbreviated БАН) is the National Academy of Bulgaria, established in 1869.

The Academy, with headquarters in Sofia, is autonomous and consists of a Society of Academicians, Correspondent Members and Foreign Members. It publishes and circulates different scientific works, encyclopaedias, dictionaries and journals, and runs its own publishing house.

The activities are distributed in three main branches: Natural, mathematical and engineering sciences; Biological, medical and agrarian sciences and Social sciences, humanities and art. They are structured in 42 independent scientific institutes, and a dozen of laboratories and other sections.
 
Julian Revalski has been the president of the BAS since 2016. As of 2022, its budget was 119,860 million leva (€61,28 million).

History 

As Bulgaria was part of the Ottoman Empire, Bulgarian émigrés founded the Bulgarian Literary Society on 26 September 1869, in Brăila in the Kingdom of Romania, on the model of the Romanian Literary Society, that had been established in 1866. The first Statutes accepted were:

Board of Trustees
 Nikolai Tsenov – President
 Vasilaki Mihailidi
 Petraki Simov
 Kostaki Popovich
 Stefan Beron

Acting members:
 Marin Drinov (1838-1906) – Chairman
 Vasil Drumev (1840-1901) – Member
 Vasil D. Stoyanov (1839-1910) – Secretary

The following year, the Literary Society began issuing the Periodical Journal, its official publication, and in 1871 elected its first honorary member - Gavril Krastevich.

In 1878, shortly after Bulgaria's liberation from Ottoman rule, the General Assembly voted to move the headquarters of the Society from Brăila to Sofia, and on 1 March 1893 the BLS moved into its own building, right next to where the Bulgarian Parliament is seated. The BLS headquarters were completed in 1892. The building was designed by architect Hermann Mayer and was expanded during the 1920s.

The Bulgarian Literary Society adopted its present-day name in 1911, and Ivan Geshov became the Academy's first president. The BAS became a member of the Union of Slavonic Academies and Scientific Communities in 1913 and was accepted as a member of the International Council of Scientific Unions in 1931.

The BAS was awarded the Japanese Foreign Minister’s Commendation for their contributions to promotion of mutual understanding between Bulgaria and Japan on 1 December 2020.

Departments 

The BAS has 9 main sections, more broadly united under three main branches: Natural, mathematical and engineering sciences; Biological, medical and agrarian sciences and Social sciences, humanities and art. Each consists of independent scientific institutes, laboratories and other sections.

Mathematical Sciences 
 Institute of Mathematics and Informatics
 Institute of Mechanics
 Institute of Information and Communication Technologies
 National Laboratory of Computer Virology

Physical Sciences 
 Institute for Nuclear Research and Nuclear Energy
 Institute of Solid State Physics
 Institute of Electronics
 Institute of Astronomy
 National Astronomical Observatory - Rozhen
 Astronomical Observatory Belogradchik
 Central Laboratory of Solar Energy and New Energy Sources
 Central Laboratory for Applied Physics - Plovdiv
 Central Laboratory of Optical Storage and Processing of Information

Chemical Sciences 
 Institute of General and Inorganic Chemistry
 Institute of Organic Chemistry with a Centre of Phytochemistry
 Institute of Physical Chemistry
 Institute of Catalysis
 Institute of Electrochemistry and Energy Systems (IIES) (former Central Laboratory of Electrochemical Power Sources)
 Institute of Chemical Engineering
 Central Laboratory of Photoprocesses
 Institute of Polymers

Biological Sciences 
 Institute of Neurobiology
 Institute of Molecular Biology
 Institute of Genetics
 Institute of Physiology
 Institute of Plant Physiology
 Institute of Microbiology
 Institute of Experimental Morphology and Anthropology
 Institute of Botany
 Institute of Zoology
 Forest Research Institute
 Institute of Experimental Pathology and Parasitology
 Institute of Biology and Immunology of Reproduction
 Institute of Biophysics and Biomedical Engineering
 National Museum of Natural History
 Central Laboratory of General Ecology

Earth Sciences 
 Geological Institute
 Geophysical Institute
 National Institute of Meteorology and Hydrology
 Central Laboratory for Geodesy
 Central Laboratory of Mineralogy and Crystallography
 Institute of Oceanology
 Geographical Institute
 Space Research Institute
 Central Laboratory of Solar - Terrestrial Influences
 Central Laboratory for Seismic Mechanics and Earthquake Engineering
 Institute of Water Problems

Engineering Sciences 
 Institute of Metal Science
 Central Laboratory of Physico-Chemical Mechanics
 Institute of Computer and Communication Systems
 Institute of Information Technologies
 Institute of Control and System Research
 Central Laboratory of Mechatronics and Instrumentation
 Bulgarian Ship Hydrodynamics Centre

Humanities (Division 'Cultural-Historical Heritage and National Identity') 
 Institute of Bulgarian Language
 Institute of Literature
 Institute for Balkan Studies and Centre for Thracology
 Institute for History Studies
 Institute for Ethnology and Folklore Studies with Ethnographic Museum, comprising the former
 Institute for Folklore Studies
 Ethnographic Institute with Museum
 Institute for Arts Studies, comprising the former
 Centre for Architectural Studies
 Institute of Art Studies
 National Archaeological Institute and Museum
 Scientific Centre for Cyrillo-Methodian Studies

Social Sciences (Division 'Man and Society') 
 Institute for Economic Studies
 Institute for the State and Law
 Institute for Population and Human Studies, comprising the former
 Institute of Psychology
 Centre for Population Studies
 Institute for the Study of Societies and Knowledge, comprising the former
 Institute of Sociology
 Institute of Philosophical Studies
 Centre for Science Studies and History of Science

Specialized and Supporting Units 
 Central Administration of BAS
 Central Library of BAS
 Scientific Archives of BAS
 'Prof. Marin Drinov' Academic Publishing House
 Botanical Garden
 National Centre on Nanoscience and Nanotechnology
 Bulgarian Encyclopaedia Scientific Information Centre
 Social - Utility Service
 Centre for National Security Research
 Research Development and Implementation Association 'Scientific Instrumentation'
 Laboratory of Telematics
 Ph.D. Research Career Development Centre

Honours 
Academia Peak and Camp Academia on Livingston Island in the South Shetland Islands, Antarctica are named for the Bulgarian Academy of Sciences in appreciation of Academy's contribution to the Antarctic exploration.

See also
Camp Academia

References

External links 
 Official website

 
Scientific organizations established in 1869
1869 establishments in the Ottoman Empire
1869 establishments in Bulgaria
Members of the International Council for Science
Members of the International Science Council
Buildings and structures in Sofia
Organizations based in Sofia